CTSS may refer to:

 Cathepsin S, a human enzyme
 Center for Terrorism & Security Studies at UMass Lowell, US
 Clementi Town Secondary School, Singapore
 Compatible Time-Sharing System, a computer operating system
 Cray Time Sharing System, a computer operating centre